Vriesea fluminensis is a plant species in the genus Vriesea. This species is endemic to Brazil.

References

fluminensis
Flora of Brazil